Roosevelt is an unincorporated community in Gilmer County, in the U.S. state of Georgia.

History
A post office called Roosevelt was established in 1900, and remained in operation until 1921. The community has the name of Theodore Roosevelt, 26th President of the United States.

References

Unincorporated communities in Gilmer County, Georgia
Unincorporated communities in Georgia (U.S. state)